HMS Ramillies was a 74-gun third rate ship of the line of the Royal Navy, launched on 12 July 1785 at Rotherhithe.

French Revolutionary Wars 

On 4 April 1796, Ramilies ran down and sank the hired armed lugger Spider while maneuvering.

In 1801, Ramilies was part of Admiral Sir Hyde Parker's reserve squadron at the Battle of Copenhagen, and so did not take an active part in the battle.

Expedition to occupy the Danish West Indies (1807) 

In 1807 Ramillies was in the West Indies as part of a squadron under the command of Rear-Admiral Alexander Cochrane, who sailed in HMS Belleisle. The squadron, which included HMS Prince George, HMS Northumberland, HMS Canada and HMS Cerberus, captured the Telemaco, Carvalho and Master on 17 April 1807.

Following the concern in Britain that neutral Denmark was entering an alliance with Napoleon, in December Ramillies participated in Cochrane's expedition that captured the Danish islands of St Thomas on 22 December and Santa Cruz on 25 December. The Danes did not resist and the invasion was bloodless.

War of 1812 

In August 1812, Sir Thomas Masterman Hardy took command of Ramillies and was sent to North America at the outbreak of the War of 1812. Hardy led the fleet in Ramillies that escorted and transported the army commanded by John Coape Sherbrooke which captured significant portions of eastern coastal Maine (then part of Massachusetts), including Fort Sullivan, Eastport, Machias, Bangor, and Castine.

On 4 December 1813 Ramilies and Loire recaptured the whaler , J.Bowman, master, which the United States Navy had captured in the South Pacific. Her captors sent Policy into Halifax, Nova Scotia.

However, on 10 August 1814, a landing party from Ramillies was defeated at Stonington, Connecticut. The party was to have burned Stonington Borough and the shipping, but was repulsed.

During the Battle of North Point, a composite battalion of Royal Marines were landed from HMS , HMS Ramillies, HMS Albion, and HMS Royal Oak, under the command of Brevet Major John Robyns. The two fatalities were from HMS Ramillies. From Baltimore Ramillies sailed to New Orleans where her boats participated in the battle of Lake Borgne in December 1814. At the end of January 1815, the prisoners of war from the Battle of Lake Borgne were transported to the Caribbean in HMS Ramillies. In 1847 the Admiralty issued a clasp (or bar) marked "14 Dec. Boat Service 1814" to survivors of the boat service who claimed the clasp to the Naval General Service Medal.

Post-war 
In June 1815 Ramillies was under the command of Captain Charles Ogle. In November, Captain Thomas Boys replaced Ogle, while Rear-Admiral Sir William Hope raised his flag in her at Leith.

In June 1818 Ramillies was at Sheerness, being fitted as a guardship. Captain Aiskew Hollis took command in September as Ramillies took up a post as guardship at Portsmouth. While at Portsmouth she employed a HMS Viper as a tender. On 30 November 1820 and 6 February 1821, Viper made some captures, presumably of smugglers, that resulted in a payment of prize money not only to the officers and crew of Viper, but also of Ramillies.

In August 1821, Ramillies came under the command of Captain Edward Brace and served in the Downs on the Coastal Blockade. She then underwent repairs between May 1822 and June 1823, and was fitted for a guardship at Portsmouth again. In May 1823 Captain William M'Cullock took command. In November 1825 Captain Hugh Pigot replaced M'Cullock. The Admiralty ordered Ramillies to the Reserve for Harbour Service in 1830, and Ramillies was on harbour service from 1831.

In June 1831 Ramillies was at Chatham Dockyard, being fitted as a lazaretto, a hospital for quarantine. She then moved to Sheerness to serve in that capacity. Ramillies was eventually broken up at Sheerness in February 1850.

Footnotes 
Notes

Citations

References
 
 Lavery, Brian (2003) The Ship of the Line - Volume 1: The development of the battlefleet 1650-1850. Conway Maritime Press. .
 
 

Ships of the line of the Royal Navy
Culloden-class ships of the line
1785 ships
Ships built in Rotherhithe
War of 1812 ships of the United Kingdom